The FPG-82 is an INS/GPS guided wing-kit for Mk-82-class bombs, under development by Friuli Aeroespacial, for the Brazilian Air Force.

Service
The FPG-82 will equip the Brazilian Air Force's F-5BR and AMX, and Brazilian Naval Aviation A-4.

Characteristics
The kit adds a 40 kg GPS/INS navigation system in a tail fairing and pop-out wing in a dorsal saddleback fairing enabling a 7:1 glide ratio aiming to increase standoff range up to 80 km.

See also
 Mk-82
 SMKB
 Joint Direct Attack Munition

References

Bibliography

 
 ;

External links
 Friuli Aeroespacial - Project Page

Aerial bombs of Brazil
Guided bombs